The Women's Freestyle competitions at the 2022 European Juniors Wrestling Championships were held in Rome, Italy between 27 June to 3 July 2022.

Women's freestyle 50 kg 
 Legend
 F — Won by fall

Top half

Bottom half

Women's freestyle 53 kg 
 Legend
 F — Won by fall

Women's freestyle 55 kg 
 Legend
 F — Won by fall

Women's freestyle 57 kg 
 Legend
 F — Won by fall

Women's freestyle 59 kg 
 Legend
 F — Won by fall

{{Repechage
| compact=y
| byes=y
| seeds=n
| nowrap=n
| RD1=Repechage round 1
| RD2=Bronze medals

| team-width=220
| score-width=30

| RD1-team01=
| RD1-score01=0
| RD1-team02=
| RD1-score02=10
| RD2-team01=
| RD2-score01=3F
| RD2-team02=
| RD2-score02=4

| RD1-team03=
| RD1-score03=2
| RD1-team04=
| RD1-score04=3F| RD2-team03=| RD2-score03=8| RD2-team04=
| RD2-score04=0
}}

 Women's freestyle 62 kg 
 Legend
 F — Won by fallTop halfBottom half Women's freestyle 65 kg 
 Legend
 F — Won by fall

 Women's freestyle 68 kg 
 Legend
 F — Won by fall

 Women's freestyle 72 kg 
 Legend
 F — Won by fall

 Women's freestyle 76 kg 
 Legend
 F''' — Won by fall

References 

Women's Freestyle